Ollie Smith (born March 8, 1949, in Jackson, Mississippi) is an American former wide receiver in the National Football League. He was drafted in the fourth round of the 1973 NFL Draft by the Baltimore Colts and played two seasons with the team. After a year away from the NFL, he played two seasons with the Green Bay Packers.

References

1949 births
Living people
Players of American football from Jackson, Mississippi
American football wide receivers
Tennessee State Tigers football players
Baltimore Colts players
Green Bay Packers players